"Wishing Well" is a song by American rapper and singer Juice Wrld, from his posthumous third studio album Legends Never Die, written by him, along with its producers Dr. Luke and Chopsquad DJ. It was sent to rhythmic contemporary radio as the album's fifth single on July 28, 2020. An animated music video was released on July 13, 2020. An uplifting song reflecting on fame, depression and drug use, the song received positive reviews from critics who regarded it as a standout, with Billboard ranking it as the best song on the album. It debuted at number five on the Billboard Hot 100, simultaneously charting in the top 10 with four other songs from the album.

Background and composition
The song first leaked under the title "Lauryn Hill", due to the line "Drugs killing me softly, Lauryn Hill". The track starts off with a guitar intro, and consists of a Robotech sample. Deemed a haunting, yet "uplifting" track, it finds Juice singing about how he is going to be ok, although it may not always be the case, because, in the end, he wants to keep his fans and family happy. Felson Sajonas of Hypebeast noted "Wishing Well" for being a metaphor for Juice's "deep desire to be free from his demons and the constant cycle of drugs and depression". In the chorus, the line "Perky got me itching like a anthill", references Percocet, a drug that led to his death. Genius' Chris Mench described the line as "a grim prediction" of Juice's passing.

Critical reception
Billboard ranked the song as the best on Legends Never Die, with the magazine's Michael Saponara regarding it as "a bonafide stand-out cut with Juice putting his gifts on display". Rolling Stones Danny Schwartz called it a "soaring standout", comparing it to Blink-182. Alex Zidel of HotNewHipHop said the song stands out "because of the troubling story that Juice tells". Aaron Williams of Uproxx praised it as the album's centerpiece, stating that the track "is a real heartbreaker and leads to some of the emotional high points of the album", while pointing out Juice Wrld's awareness of his drug problem, citing the lyrics "If it wasn't for the pills, I wouldn't be here / But if I keep taking these pills, I won't be here". Varietys Jem Aswad named it one of the top songs of the week, noting its "unintentionally timely" opening line: "I can't breathe". However, the magazine misattributed the line to a different Juice Wrld song, "Conversations".

Music video
An official animated video was released on July 13, 2020. The KDC Visions-created visual opens with Juice throwing his feelings out of a cardboard box into an actual wishing well. As with the song's lyrics, it further shows Juice reflecting on how he copes with fame and drug use. A variety of emojis acts as his emotions, while scenes cut to an army of ants, Juice gazing into the stars on top of his convertible, and living an extravagant lifestyle at his mansion. He is also seen seeking help through phone calls and talking to a psychiatrist, portrayed by himself.

Charts

Weekly charts

Year-end charts

Certifications

References

2020 singles
2020 songs
Juice Wrld songs
Songs written by Juice Wrld
Songs written by Dr. Luke
Song recordings produced by Dr. Luke
Songs released posthumously
Interscope Records singles
Animated music videos